Weber Street is a major roadway connecting the cities of Kitchener and Waterloo in Ontario, Canada. It forms a component of Waterloo Regional Road 8, whose route designation continues along several other roads in south Kitchener and Cambridge.

Weber Street is considered an eastwest street within the Kitchener street system, and a northsouth street in Waterloo, similarly to King Street. It runs parallel and to the east of King Street for much of its length.

History

The street is likely named after one of the Germans from Pennsylvania who migrated to the region  It is the only remaining major street in Kitchener Waterloo with a Germanic name or named for German settlers in the region.

In 2013–14, the Region of Waterloo widened the last remaining two-lane stretch of roadway between College Street in Kitchener and Union Street in Waterloo, a project which resulted in the demolition of dozens of homes and other buildings along the street. The same project also resulted in the creation of the Weber Street Railway Underpass, grade separating the roadway and sidewalks from the Guelph Subdivision railway line, the latter of which runs overhead. The Guelph Subdivision forms a component of the Canadian National Railway mainline west of Toronto. The segment of the Guelph Subdivision which crosses Weber Street has been owned by Metrolinx since 2014.

Geography

Weber Street southern terminus is at the southern stub of King Street in Kitchener, and its northern terminus is at its intersection with King Street at the St. Jacobs Farmers' Market south of St. Jacobs. In addition to its two endpoints, Weber Street also crosses King Street in Waterloo, being generally northeast of King Street in Kitchener and southern Waterloo, and southwest of King Street in northern Waterloo.

Weber weaves through residential and commercial areas of Waterloo and Kitchener and is agricultural at the northern terminus.

The road is broken up into four parts due to the geographical direction of the road:

Kitchener
 Weber Street East - Florence Avenue to Queen Street North
 Weber Street West - Queen Street North to the Kitchener-Waterloo Boundary near Raitar Avenue

Waterloo
 Weber Street South - Kitchener-Waterloo Boundary near Raitar Avenue to Erb Street East
 Weber Street North - Erb Street East to King Street North south of St. Jacobs, Ontario

Crossings and intersections

Weber Street intersects with a number of east-west thoroughfares:
 Conestoga Parkway
 Ottawa Street
 Frederick Street
 Victoria Street
 Erb Street
 Bridgeport Road
 University Avenue
 Columbia Street
 King Street (in three different places)
 Northfield Drive

Places of interest

 St. Jacobs Farmers' Market
 Bridgeport Plaza
 Kitchener station
 Downtown Community Centre (Kitchener)
 Kitchener Memorial Auditorium Complex (on nearby East Avenue)
 St. Peter's Lutheran Cemetery
 Eastwood Collegiate Institute

See also

 List of numbered roads in Waterloo Region

References

Citations

Bibliography

External links
 

8
Roads in Kitchener, Ontario
Roads in Waterloo, Ontario